Róbert Isaszegi (born 2 May 1965 in Sárospatak, Borsod-Abaúj-Zemplén) is a Hungarian boxer, who won the  bronze medal in the light flyweight division (– 48 kg) at the 1988 Summer Olympics.

Amateur career
Bronze medalist in the 1985 European Amateur Boxing Championships at Light Flyweight, Budapest, Hungary
Silver medalist in the 1989 European Amateur Boxing Championships at Light Flyweight, Athen, Greece
Bronze medalist in the 1990 Goodwill Games at Light Flyweight, Seattle, WA, USA
Representing Hungary, won the Light Flyweight bronze medal at the 1988 Olympics in Seoul, Korea.

Olympic Results
1988 Olympic Results - Boxed as a Light Flyweights (48 kg)
1st Round - bye
Round of 32 - Defeated Colin Moore of Guyana, 5-0
Round of 16 - Defeated Sadoon Abboud of Iraq, RSC-1
Quarterfinals - Defeated Chartchai Sasakul of Thailand, 3-2
Semifinals - Lost to Michael Carbajal of United States, 1-4

Pro career
Isaszegi began his professional career in 1988 and had limited success, most recently losing in 2005 to Ivan Pozo by 1st round TKO.

External links
 
sports-reference

1965 births
Living people
Olympic boxers of Hungary
Boxers at the 1988 Summer Olympics
Olympic bronze medalists for Hungary
Flyweight boxers
Olympic medalists in boxing
Hungarian male boxers
Medalists at the 1988 Summer Olympics
Competitors at the 1990 Goodwill Games